Comedy Central Films was the motion picture production arm of the  adult-oriented comedy television cable channel Comedy Central. The studio produces comedy films aimed at a mature audience and based on Comedy Central shows. Many of which were distributed by Paramount Pictures.

The first project developed for the unit was South Park: Bigger, Longer & Uncut.

These are films that were theatrically released and based on Comedy Central properties.

 South Park: Bigger, Longer & Uncut (1999) (with Paramount Pictures, Warner Bros. Pictures, Scott Rudin Productions and Braniff Productions)
 The Hebrew Hammer (2003) (with ContentFilm and Strand Releasing)
 Strangers with Candy (2006) (with THINKFilm)
 Reno 911!: Miami (2007) (with 20th Century Fox, Paramount Pictures and Jersey Films)
 The Drawn Together Movie: The Movie! (2010) (Direct-to-video)
 New Kids Turbo (2010) (Netherlands)
 New Kids Nitro (2011) (Netherlands)
 Kevin Hart: Laugh at My Pain (2011)
 Jason Nash is Married (2014)

References 

 
Films
Film production companies of the United States
Mass media companies established in 1995
1995 establishments in the United States
Mass media companies disestablished in 2014
2014 disestablishments in the United States